Sneakacydal is the debut studio solo album by rapper, Keak da Sneak. It sold 1,500 copies in its first week out, and did not chart.

Track listing
"Intro"- 1:47 
"Hit 'Em Where It Hurts"- 3:09 
"Skit"- 1:06 
"L.W.L."- 4:04 (Featuring 3X Krazy)
"Jim Hats ft [Yukmouth]"- 4:02 
"No Love"- 4:01 
"High Tech"- 4:21 
"Sneakacydal"- 3:52 
"Skit"- :21 
"Split Youres"- 4:03 (Featuring Whoridas)
"Sneak Out"- 4:09 
"Alright Cool"- 3:43 
"Runnin'"- 4:53 
"A.O.B."- 4:28 
"Rydas"- 4:33 (Featuring Big Lurch)

1999 debut albums
Keak da Sneak albums